Desmond Sandford "Sandy" Hawley,  (born April 16, 1949 in Oshawa, Ontario) is a Canadian Hall of Fame jockey.

Sandy Hawley decided to be a jockey when he was a 17-year-old boy, hotwalking, grooming and excise horses at a Woodbine racetrack in Toronto Ontario. Two years later, when he was 19 years old, he rode his first race at Woodbine race track as a Jockey. Then he became a regular rider at racetracks in Ontario and then rode at racetracks on the East Coast of the United States. Hawley became the first jockey to ever lead the Canadian standings in a full season as an apprentice. In 1969, a time when there were no Sovereign or Eclipse Awards for jockeys, Hawley rode 230 winners, the most that year of any apprentice jockey in North America. He went on to race in the United States where he led all jockeys in victories for the years 1970, 1972, 1973 and 1976. In the 1973 season, he became the first jockey to ever win 500 races in one year, breaking Bill Shoemaker's record. Sandy Hawley has career earnings of over $88.6 million and was one of the most successful jockeys of his generation.

Racing in California, Hawley was named the winner of Santa Anita Park's prestigious George Woolf Memorial Jockey Award. Given to a North American rider who demonstrates the highest of standards of personal and professional conduct both on and off the racetrack, Hawley has had the lifelong reputation of being a gentleman and a man of honor. In 1976 he won the Eclipse Award for Outstanding Jockey in the United States after he broke thoroughbred racing's all-time money-winning record for a single year.

As a boy growing up in Canada, Hawley developed a love for the game of ice hockey and while riding in California, he got an ice-level job as a penalty timekeeper for the home games of the Los Angeles Kings hockey team, giving himself a great view of his favorite game.

He won the Lou Marsh Trophy in 1973 and 1976 as Canada’s top athlete and was named a Member of the Order of Canada, his country’s highest individual civilian honor for outstanding accomplishments by a citizen.

In addition to winning many major Stakes races in the United States, four times he won Canada's most prestigious thoroughbred horse race, the Queen's Plate. Twice, Hawley won seven races in a single day at Toronto’s Woodbine Racetrack and at Santa Anita Park had six wins in a single day on two occasions. Hawley and Avelino Gomez each won the Coronation Futurity Stakes a record five times. Gomez won the race four years running between 1964 and 1967. Hawley won the race five out of six years between 1971 and 1976, his streak broken by Gomez's fifth win in 1972.

Hawley's best result in the Kentucky Derby was two third-place finishes one of which was with Golden Act in 1979 aboard whom he finished second in both the Preakness and Belmont Stakes.

Overall, Sandy Hawley's career as a jockey spanned 31 years from 1968 to his retirement on July 1, 1998. He had 31,455 mounts, garnering 6,449 wins and won 18 riding titles at Woodbine Racetrack.

Diagnosed with skin cancer in 1987, doctors only gave him a few months to live but he fought to overcome the disease with experimental drugs, a careful high-fiber diet, and his sheer determination.

Sandy Hawley was voted the 1986 Avelino Gomez Memorial Award and that same year was inducted into the Canadian Horse Racing Hall of Fame. He was inducted into the United States National Museum of Racing and Hall of Fame in 1992 and Canada's Sports Hall of Fame in 1998. He was inducted into the Ontario Sports Hall of Fame in 1999.

The Sandy Hawley Award is presented every year by the Ontario Sports Hall of Fame to an individual who best exemplifies a dedication to the community.

He currently is a Public Relations Ambassador for Woodbine Entertainment Group, and resides in Toronto, Ontario with his wife Kaoru. He has worked as an analyst for The Score and CKXT-TV's horse racing coverage.
Sandy Desmond Hawley's walk of Fame square is the only Mirvish walk of Fame square I am physically able to easily sit down on with my medical condition that I am not welcome to receive care for. 
If I lie down though security guards will come by and ask if I am alright like when I lie down next to the elephant sculpture. Armed security guards will request me to sit on the square only.

Living Legends Race
On October 18, 2008 at Santa Anita Park, Sandy Hawley and seven other U.S. Racing Hall of Fame jockeys came out of retirement for the Living Legends Race that officially counted in their career totals and was specially approved for legalized parimutuel wagering. Hawley earned his 6,450th official career victory with a win aboard Tribal Chief, a horse owned by musician/record producer Herb Alpert and his brother David Alpert.

Selected major race wins
Alabama Stakes (1970)
Queen's Plate (1970, 1971, 1975, 1978)
Prince of Wales Stakes (1970 & 1975)
Whitney Handicap (1975)
Washington, D.C. International (1975 & 1976)
Sport Page Handicap (1976)
Canadian International Stakes (1976 & 1979)
Man O' War Stakes (1977)
San Felipe Stakes (1977, 1979, 1984)
Breeders' Stakes (1972, 1976, 1979, 1988)
Hollywood Gold Cup (1981)
Hollywood Futurity (1983)
Lane's End Breeders' Futurity (1986)
Spinster Stakes 1986
Ashland Stakes (1987)
Jamaica Handicap (1989)

References
 Sandy Hawley official website
 Sandy Hawley at the Canadian Horse Racing Hall of Fame
 Sandy Hawley at Canada's Sports Hall of Fame
 Sandy Hawley at the United States' National Museum of Racing and Hall of Fame
 Hawley, Sandy & Lefko, Perry. Ride of a Lifetime: The Sandy Hawley Story (2005) H.B. Fenn 
 Sandy Hawley profile at the NTRA
 

1949 births
Living people
Canadian jockeys
Sovereign Award winners
Canadian Horse Racing Hall of Fame inductees
Avelino Gomez Memorial Award winners
American jockeys
Eclipse Award winners
Lou Marsh Trophy winners
American Champion jockeys
Members of the Order of Canada
United States Thoroughbred Racing Hall of Fame inductees
Sportspeople from Oshawa
Canadian horse racing announcers
Canadian emigrants to the United States